

Karl Hans Maximilian von Le Suire (8 November 1898 – 18 June 1954) was a German general during World War II who commanded the XXXXIX Mountain Corps. He was responsible for the Massacre of Kalavryta, in Greece.

Life and career
Karl von Le Suire was born on 8 November 1898 in Unterwössen in Upper Bavaria. After entering the German Army in December 1916, he was commissioned as a lieutenant in the Bavarian infantry and served on the Western Front. He continued in the army after 1918. 

Von Le Suire held a number of staff appointments in the early part of World War II, including Chief of Staff of Gebirgs Corps Norway. He was then given command of the 99th Gebirgsjager Regiment. This was followed by command of the 46th Infantry Division in February 1943 and the Balkans-based 117th Jäger Division in May 1943. 

In November 1943, while commanded by von Le Suire, the 117th Jäger Division began a mission named Unternehmen Kalavryta (Operation Kalavryta), intending to encircle Greek guerrilla fighters in the mountainous area surrounding Kalavryta. During the operations, some German soldiers were killed and 77 of them, who were taken prisoners, were executed by the Greek guerrillas. On 10 December 1943 von Le Suire signed the order for the German division to "level the locations Mazeika and Kalavryta". In total, more than 1,200 civilians were killed during the reprisal operations. About 1,000 houses were looted and burned and more than 2,000 sheep and other large domestic animals were seized by the Germans. The event is known as the Massacre of Kalavryta.

From August 1944 von Le Suire commanded the XXXXIX Mountain Corps, and was still in command when he surrendered to Soviet troops in May 1945. He died in Soviet captivity on 18 June 1954 in a prisoner of war camp at Stalingrad.

Awards and decorations
 Iron Cross (1914) 2nd Class (28 March 1918) & 1st Class (19 December 1921)
 Clasp to the Iron Cross (1939) 2nd Class (13 September 1939) & 1st Class (13 September 1939)
 German Cross in Gold (25 April 1942)
 Knight's Cross of the Iron Cross on 26 November 1944 as General der Gebirgstruppe and commander of XXXXIX. Gebirgskorps

See also 
War crimes of the Wehrmacht

References

Citations

External links
 Crimes of the German Wehrmacht

1898 births
1954 deaths
German mass murderers
People from the Kingdom of Bavaria
People from Traunstein (district)
Generals of Mountain Troops
German Army personnel of World War I
Recipients of the clasp to the Iron Cross, 1st class
Recipients of the Gold German Cross
Recipients of the Knight's Cross of the Iron Cross
Recipients of the Order of the Cross of Liberty, 1st Class
German prisoners of war in World War II held by the Soviet Union
German people who died in Soviet detention
Military personnel from Bavaria
Bavarian nobility
20th-century Freikorps personnel
Nazi war criminals